DFI, or Diamond Flower Inc., is a motherboard manufacturer based in Taiwan.

DFI may also refer to:

Organizations 
 DAISY Forum of India
 Danish Film Institute
 Deep Foundations Institute
 Department for Infrastructure (Northern Ireland)
 Deutsch-Französisches Institut, German for the Franco-German Institute in Ludwigsburg
 Deutsch-Französisches Institut, a French-language institute in Erlangen
 Development finance institution, risk capital provider
 Development Fund for Iraq
 Division of Field Investigations, criminal investigations arm of New York Department of Motor Vehicles
 Doha Film Institute
 Drøbak-Frogn IL, a Norwegian sports club

Other 
 DFI Retail Group, a pan-Asian retail company based in Hong Kong
 Dietary fructose malabsorption